Michal Kraľovič (born 25 January 1999) is a Slovak footballer who plays as forward for ŠK Odeva Lipany in 3. Liga.

Career

1. FC Tatran Prešov
Kraľovič made his Fortuna Liga debut for 1. FC Tatran Prešov against Slovan Bratislava on 23 July 2017.

References

External links
 1. FC Tatran Prešov official club profile 
 
 
 Ligy.sk profile 
 Futbalnet profile 

1999 births
Living people
Slovak footballers
Slovakia youth international footballers
Association football forwards
1. FC Tatran Prešov players
ŠK Odeva Lipany players
Slovak Super Liga players
2. Liga (Slovakia) players
3. Liga (Slovakia) players
Sportspeople from Liptovský Mikuláš